Jerry Bremner (born January 27, 1960) is a Canadian professional chuckwagon racer. He is a three-time World Champion Chuckwagon Driver and was the 1986 World Champion Outrider.

Career
Bremner grew up in Rapid View, Saskatchewan, He started his chuckwagon racing career as an outrider when he was 12 in 1972 with the Northern Chuckwagon Racing Association, and began driving when he was 24 in 1984 on the World Professional Chuckwagon Association (WPCA) circuit. Jerry became the second rookie to win a show on the WPCA Pro Tour (after Rick Fraser when he captured the Trochu Chuckwagon Championship in 1984 and was named the WPCA Top Rookie Driver in 1984 as well. He won his first Calgary Stampede trophy in 1982 as an outrider for Dave Lewis, another in 1984 outriding for Dallas Dorchester, and in 1986 he was the World Champion Outrider.

After starting his driving career in 1984, by 1989 he had some three small shows at the Trochu Chuckwagon Championship in 1984 and 1989, and the chuckwagon championship in Rimbey in 1986. None of these wins had points that counted towards the World Championship. In 1990, Jerry captured the Trochu Chuckwagon Championship for the third time, and although it was a no-points show, Jerry was the top point earner on the World Professional Chuckwagon Association (WPCA) circuit by years end and was named the 1990 World Champion Chuckwagon Driver. In 1993, he won the second major title of his career when he captured the Calgary Stampede Rangeland Derby Championship.

Over the next 15 years, Bremner was a regular winner on the WPCA Pro Tour. He captured two more World Chuckwagon Championships in 1995 and 2003, and twice won the Ponoka Stampede Championship in 1996 and 2007. He also captured the Grande Prairie Stompede on three occasions, and the North American Chuckwagon Championship and Medicine Hat Exhibition & Stampede championships twice each among others. Jerry also had 4 horses named to the WPCA Equine Outfit of Excellence. Jerry retired at the end of the 2015 Calgary Stampede

Personal life
Jerry is a third generation chuckwagon driver whose father was former Calgary Stampede finalist Roy Bremner. Jerry has two children - Shane and Jaycee. Along with his wife Donna, the Bremners make their home in Westerose, Alberta.

Professional Wins
1986 World Champion Outrider
1990 World Champion Chuckwagon Driver
1995 World Champion Chuckwagon Driver
2003 World Champion Chuckwagon Driver

Show Wins - Driver (18)
1984 (1) Trochu Chuckwagon Championship
1986 (1) Rimby Chuckwagon Championship
1989 (1) Trochu Chuckwagon Championship
1990 (1) Trochu Chuckwagon Championship
1993 (2) Trochu Chuckwagon Championship, Calgary Stampede Rangeland Derby Champion Driver
1994 (2) Grande Prairie Stompede, Moses Lake Roundup
1996 (2) Trochu Chuckwagon Championship, Ponoka Stampede Championship
2006 (3) Medicine Hat Exhibition & Stampede, North American Chuckwagon Championship, WPCA Dodge Pro Tour Championship
2007 (3) Grande Prairie Stompede, Ponoka Stampede Championship, Medicine Hat Exhibition & Stampede
2008 (1) Grande Prairie Stompede, WPCA Equine Outfit of Excellence - "STORM" - Champion Outriding Horse
2009 (1) North American Chuckwagon Championship

Major Wins - Outrider (4)
This list is probably incomplete
1982 (2) Calgary Stampede Rangeland Derby Champion Outrider, Calgary Stampede Aggregate Champion Outrider
1984 (1) Calgary Stampede Rangeland Derby Champion Outrider
1991 (2) Calgary Stampede Rangeland Derby Champion Outrider

Awards
WPCA Top Rookie Driver (1984)
WPCA Most Improved Chuckwagon Driver (1986)
WPCA Clean Drive Award (2003)
Guy Weadick Award (2005)
WPCA Equine Award Of Excellence - "SLASH" - Champion Outriding Horse (2006)
WPCA Equine Award Of Excellence - "MONARCH" - Champion Left Wheeler (2007)
WPCA Equine Outfit of Excellence - "STORM" - Champion Outriding Horse (2008)
WPCA Equine Outfit of Excellence - "WHISPER" - Champion Right Leader (2011)

Personal life
Jerry is a second generation chuckwagon driver whose father was former Calgary Stampede finalist Roy Bremner. Jerry has two children - Shane and Jaycee. Along with his wife Donna, the Bremners make their home in Westerose, Alberta.

References

External links
Jerry Bremner's profile at www.halfmileofhell.com
WPCA Awards

1960 births
Living people